The Jonathan Coleman Experience was an Australian nationally syndicated radio program. It was hosted by radio and television personality Jonathan Coleman and comedian Julia Zemiro from 2006 until 2008. It was succeeded by the Jono & Dano Show.

Affiliates
Affiliates of The Jonathan Coleman Experience included stations on the Australian Radio Network as well as stations in the Macquarie Regional RadioWorks network.

New South Wales: 
Sydney: 101.7 WSFM
Griffith: 2RG
Coffs Harbour: 2CS FM
Orange: 2GZ FM
Port Macquarie: 2MC FM
Wagga Wagga: 2WG
Young: 2LF
Victoria: 
Melbourne: Gold 104.3
Bendigo: 3BO FM
Mildura: 3MA FM
Shepparton: 3SR FM
Warragul-Gippsland: 3GG
Queensland: 
Brisbane: 4KQ
Charters Towers: 4GC
Emerald: 4HI
Mareeba-Atherton: 4AM
Mount Isa: 4LM
Kingaroy: Heart 1071
Roma: 4ZR
Toowoomba-Warwick: 4GR
South Australia:
Mount Gambier: 5SE
Tasmania:
Hobart: Heart 107
Burnie: Heart 7BU
Devonport: Heart 7AD
Scottsdale: Heart 7SD

References

Australian radio programs
2006 establishments in Australia
2008 disestablishments in Australia
2000s Australian radio programs